Family Pride was a short-lived British soap opera produced by Central Television, which ran for two series from 1991–92. It was written by Mahmood Jamal and Barry Simmer and centred on the lives of three Asian families living in Birmingham. It was produced by Zia Mohyeddin, directed by Henry Foster and Faris Kermani, and first appeared on 30 June 1991.

The series was shown in the Midlands region on ITV and nationally on Channel 4.

Among the actors to have appeared in the series were Paul Henry, Rula Lenska and Zia Mohyeddin.

External links

1990s British television soap operas
1991 British television series debuts
1992 British television series endings
British television soap operas
Channel 4 television dramas
ITV television dramas
Television series by ITV Studios
Television shows set in Birmingham, West Midlands
English-language television shows
Television shows produced by Central Independent Television